Surabhi Dashputra is an Indian singer and lyricist who works in the Bollywood entertainment industry.

Career
Dashputra appeared as a vocalist on MTV Coke Studio season 3 for various episodes with music producer Hitesh Sonik and Vijay Prakash.

Filmography

Songs

References

External links 
 
 
 World Wide Records
 Times Of India
 One India Concert
 Recording with Sunidhi Chauhan

Year of birth missing (living people)
Living people
21st-century Indian singers
Bollywood playback singers
Hindi-language lyricists
Indian women playback singers
Indian women pop singers
Singers from Mumbai
21st-century Indian women singers
Women musicians from Maharashtra